Doug Williams is a fictional character on the American soap opera Days of Our Lives. He has been portrayed by Bill Hayes since 1970. Since 1999, Hayes has continued to make recurring appearances as Doug, notably airing during the holiday seasons.

Storylines 
Born Brent Douglas, he later changed his name to Doug Williams. He is the half-brother of Byron Carmichael. He is the father of Hope Williams and Douglas LeClair. He is the husband of Julie Williams, whom he has married three times. Doug is also the ex-husband of Kim Douglas and Lee DuMonde and the widower of Addie Horton.

In 1970, Bill Horton met a curious character while in prison for his involvement in Kitty Horton's death. Bill's cellmate, Brent Douglas, was different from the rest of the earthy prison population, though his first words to Bill were hardly friendly: "If you touch my bunk, I'll kill you." He was a singer/con man who was actually intelligent. He and Bill became fast friends in prison despite their rocky start. While in the big house, Brent and Bill had long conversations about Bill's hometown, Salem, and its residents. During one of these talks, Bill innocently mentioned the fact that Susan Martin had inherited $250,000 from her late husband David. This large sum of money sparked Brent's interest, and he made a mental note of it. When Bill left the prison, he told Brent to stop by Salem anytime. When Brent was released, that's exactly what he did. Except for one thing: he came to Salem using the name Doug Williams.

As soon as Doug arrived in Salem, he looked up Susan. He tried to charm  her, but she didn't fall for it. She liked Scott Banning too much to be entranced by Doug's flirtations. However, Susan did make Doug a proposition: she would pay Doug to have an affair with Julie Banning in order to win Scott back from Julie. Doug agreed and began charming Julie. What Doug never counted on was falling in love with Julie. After some time passed, Susan told Doug that she couldn't go through with their agreement any longer. It was too late—Doug and Julie had fallen for each other.

Meanwhile, Doug was hired to sing at Sergio's. By the end of the year, he and Julie had become lovers. As time went by, they dreamed of the day they would marry and go on a romantic honeymoon in Portofino, Italy. Unfortunately, Julie was still married to Scott and had remained married to him in order to remain a part of her son David's life. For well over a year, Doug and Julie had an affair behind Scott's back; the only one aware of it was Susan, whose guilt for instigating the affair compelled her to keep quiet.

While Julie prepared divorce papers behind Scott's back, Doug planned their Portofino honeymoon. Things changed dramatically for Doug and Julie when her recently widowed mother, Addie Horton, arrived in Salem. Addie despised Doug and soon had him investigated by a detective. Addie dragged out many skeletons from Doug's closet, including his real identity, his background as a con man, a previous marriage to a woman named Kim Douglas, and the fact that Julie and Doug were having an affair. When Addie confronted Doug, she basically told him he was dirt. However, Doug retorted by telling Addie that she was no better, having married Ben Olson merely for wealth and social status and failing to be a good mother to Julie. Doug made Addie to see the truth about herself. Needless to say, Addie remained quiet about Julie's affair with Doug and his other secrets. As time passed, Doug and Addie began to get along much better and somehow their former rivalry turned into a close friendship. Meanwhile, Doug confronted his wife, Kim Douglas, and asked for a divorce. Despite Kim's protests, she finally agreed to the divorce and left Salem.

In the summer of 1972, the time came for Doug and Julie to elope. Her divorce petition was just about ready, and he had the arrangements for their Italian honeymoon all set. But at the last minute, Doug and Julie had a fight that would change their lives drastically. Julie insisted on bringing David along on the honeymoon. Doug was opposed to this idea; he also did not agree with Julie's plans to take David away from Scott, who loved the boy as his own son. During their fight, Julie walked out on Doug. Later that night, Addie stopped by and asked Doug to marry her. On the rebound, and always up for an adventure, Doug agreed. At midnight, Doug and Addie left for Portofino using the tickets that he had meant to use with Julie. Julie was crushed.

But as unlikely as the match was, Doug and Addie fit very well together. They understood one another and, before long, loved each other. Doug caused Addie to completely change into a new woman. The snooty socialite became the loving wife. To celebrate their marriage, Addie bought Doug the restaurant Sergio's and renamed it "Doug's Place." Doug was thrilled to finally have his own club. And though life seemed perfect, Doug and Julie's relationship remained strained. Despite a great marriage to Addie, Doug still loved Julie.

Soon, Addie became pregnant. That joy turned sour when she was also diagnosed with Leukemia. Doctors warned Doug and Julie that chemotherapy would be the only way to save Addie. Addie, however, refused the treatment for fear of harming her unborn child. Doug stood by her in her decision to let God decide her fate. Addie carried the baby to term, but was expected to die during labor. Neither mother nor daughter died. In the end, Doug and Addie became parents to a girl who they named Hope, in honor of all they ever had throughout the pregnancy—hope. Miraculously, Addie's deadly Leukemia soon went into remission. Addie and Doug had a bright future ahead of them. Sadly, three months after Hope's birth, Addie was struck by an oncoming truck and died. Doug was devastated.

Doug sank into a deep depression following Addie's death...a depression that no one could lift him from. He completely immersed himself into his work at Doug's Place and devoted his free time to Hope. No one, not even Julie, could get close to Doug. Finally, Doug opened up to a new singer of his at Doug's Place, Jeri Clayton. During this time, Doug came to the realization that he might never have another child to raise along with Hope. Wanting to give Hope a sibling, he participated in a new surrogate mother program at the hospital. Doug's child would be borne by an unknown woman and then given to him after its birth. Meanwhile, the relationship between Doug and Julie ignited once again despite the fact that she was now Mrs. Robert Anderson. But when it was discovered that Julie was pregnant with Bob's child, Doug told her that he didn't love her anymore. He would not destroy a family for the sake of his love for Julie. However, Julie's marriage to Bob was on the rocks and, when they separated, Doug offered Julie one of his guest rooms. Though nothing happened between them at first, they eventually rekindled their relationship. This didn't sit well with David Banning, Julie's son. Soon after arguing with Julie about her affair with Doug, David died in a car accident and possible suicide. Julie was beside herself. What was worse was the fact that Brooke Hamilton, David's girlfriend, had taken it upon herself to spread vicious rumors about Doug and Julie to avenge David's death. Brooke told several people the reason for David and Julie's argument, and implied that Doug and Julie's affair had carried on for a long time. Although Bob was understanding and willing to give Julie a divorce, Alice was furious. Because of Brooke's lies, she believed that Doug had cheated on Addie. After the air was cleared, Doug and Julie slowly continued their relationship. A few months later, Julie suffered a miscarriage as a result of falling down a flight of stairs.

While consoling Julie, Doug and Julie grew close once again. Meanwhile, Bob and Julie divorced; having lost the child, there was no need to remain married. Doug and Julie were together once again and were finally free to marry. Thinking that he and Julie would have children in the future, Doug informed Neil Curtis, the head of the hospital's surrogate program, that he no longer wanted the surrogate mother's child. He was completely unaware that the woman who was carrying his child was none other than Rebecca North, Hope's nanny. In time, Neil secretly told Doug that Rebecca was carrying his child. Doug confronted Rebecca with this fact and they both agreed to keep this a secret since she had recently married Doug's best friend, Robert LeClair. She soon gave birth to a son, whom she named Dougie LeClair in honor of his real father.

Just as things were looking good for Doug and Julie, Kim Douglas stormed into Salem once again. This time, she made her past relationship with Doug (whom she had known & married as Brent Douglas) very public. In fact, she informed Doug that he and Julie would not be able to marry because she had never signed their divorce papers four years earlier! Doug and Kim were still married. For months, Doug sought a divorce from Kim to no avail. More troublesome was the fact that Doug still held feelings for Kim...feelings which made Julie insanely jealous. Also, Doug discovered that he withstood to inherit a large island in the Pacific Ocean. As Kim's husband, Doug was, of all things, a Polynesian prince (Kim was a Polynesian princess.) Finally, Julie called it quits with Doug and sought comfort from Don Craig. Doug tried to reconcile with Julie, but it still didn't change the fact that he was still married to another woman. After some time, Doug discovered that he was not the owner of a Polynesian island. The only way this could be possible was if he wasn't married to Kim. Kim confessed to Doug that she had lied: she had signed the divorce papers, and they were no longer married. These news, however, came a little too late. Julie and Don were engaged to marry. Thinking that he had lost Julie forever, Doug did the unthinkable and proposed to Kim, a proposal Kim joyously accepted! However, it was painfully obvious that Doug and Julie were merely settling for their respective fiancées. Finally, Doug and Julie managed to work their problems out and became engaged once again, and broke off their former engagements. Shortly before the scheduled wedding, Doug suffered a terrible car accident while driving late at night. Fortunately, he survived it with minor injuries.

At long last, Doug and Julie's wedding day finally arrived and a perfect wedding followed. Although Kim loomed in the shadows of the Church, she refrained from causing any problems, knowing all too well that she had finally lost Doug. Doug and Julie topped off their nuptials with a month-long honeymoon in Europe, taking the Honeymoon Express throughout several countries. In the meantime, Kim said good-bye to Doug and to Salem.

Married life for Doug and Julie was pretty uneventful. However, in the fall of 1977, a businessman named Larry Atwood became interested in Doug's Place. He approached Doug about setting up gambling in Doug's Place, even though gambling was illegal in Salem. Naturally, Doug refused Larry's offer. Unfortunately, Larry took another route and opened his own club, The Pines. Not only did Doug's clientele begin to dwindle, but also his performers. Larry's first move was to lure one of Doug's best singers, Jeri Clayton. Also at this time, Doug's liquor license came under question when information about Doug's past as Brent Douglas mysteriously began to surface. When the license was suspended, Larry offered to help Doug recover it. Knowing that Larry must've had something to do with all of this, Doug refused. With no liquor license, Julie suggested to turn Doug's Place into a coffee house in order to stay in business. Though a good effort, Doug's Coffee House was a failure. Having no income, Doug decided to begin performing in clubs around the country to make money. Unfortunately, Doug's singing gigs took him away from his family from extended periods of time, and his relationship with the family began to suffer.

Meanwhile, things continued to complicate thanks to Larry Atwood. During a singing gig in Twin Falls, Wisconsin, a showgirl planted cocaine in his dressing room and called the police. On New Year's Day, 1978, news of Doug's drug bust were printed in the papers. The arrest wasn't the worst thing, however, since Doug was released after no concrete evidence was found connecting Doug to the cocaine. The downside to all of this was Doug's image, both private and public. His hearing with the Alcohol Control Board to have his liquor license reinstated was less than two weeks away. This arrest would probably cost him the license. Soon after being released, Doug got a job singing on a Caribbean cruise. While in the Caribbean, he spoke to Julie, who told him that there was little hope of his liquor license being reinstated. Imagine Doug's surprise when he returned to Salem and was handed his liquor license—the Board had ruled in his favor! However, the victory was bittersweet. Doug noticed that Julie had become distant. She wouldn't let him make love to her, claiming that she was not feeling well. Though he thought that it was because of the time they'd spent apart, Doug soon realized something deeper was bothering her. His suspicions grew when a neighbor told him that Julie had returned home one night with her dress torn. Julie claimed that it had just been an accident. Some days later, Doug received an anonymous letter claiming that Julie was having an affair with Larry Atwood. Thinking this was why Julie wouldn't make love to him, Doug angrily confronted her. Finally, Julie told him that Larry had raped her. That night, Doug stormed out of the house bent on killing Larry.

By the time Doug returned home, Larry was dead. During his absence, Larry had been shot in his own studio. When Doug came home, he found a hysterical Julie saying that they had to find a way to keep the police from knowing that he killed Larry. However, he assured her that he hadn't killed him! After leaving the house, Doug had gone to The Pines looking for Larry but hadn't found him. So instead, he went to a coffee shop and calmed down. The next morning, Doug and Julie were called in for questioning, since they were both suspects. Doug was suspected because he had been looking for Larry before the shooting. Julie was suspected because she'd been seen leaving Larry's studio before his body was found. Doug was immediately cleared when a waitress from the coffee shop testified that he had been there during the time of the murder. Julie, however, had no alibi. After the police searched their home, she was arrested. The police had found a blood-stained dress, the murder weapon, and the letter accusing Julie and Larry of having an affair. Trying to protect Julie, Doug confessed to the crime. Since it was obvious he was trying to cover for Julie, Doug's confession was immediately dismissed. Soon, Julie was indicted for murder.

Besides the murder, Doug and Julie had another, more internal, problem. The knowledge of Julie's rape left Doug impotent. So now it was he who couldn't make love to her. So while they waited for the trial to begin, Doug and Julie attended therapy sessions to work through their sexual problems. Meanwhile, the trial began, and to a very bad start. Julie continued to be painted in a very bad light. Finally, she was placed on the stand, where she admitted that Larry had raped her. Unfortunately, this only made things worse since it gave her a motive for killing Larry. However, she was finally acquitted when the real murderer, one of Larry's employees, turned up. His confession was played for the jury and Julie was released. Julie's acquittal immediately took all stress away from both her and Doug. They celebrated their success by making love.

Doug and Julie went to Paris to rest from all of the troubles they'd had. While visiting the city, they stopped to see Steven Olson, Julie's brother. Somehow they thought it would be a good idea if he came to Salem, so he did. Once there, Steve began working with Julie in her new venture, an antique store named Chez Julie. However, Doug soon became suspicious of Steve when he noticed that customers were paying bogus handling charges. When Doug confronted Steve, he admitted to scamming some customers and promised not to do it again. Doug said that he wouldn't tell Julie as long as Steve returned the money he'd stolen. But instead of heeding Doug's advice, Steve continued to scam people by selling phony antiques. When Doug called him on this scam, he threatened to turn him into the authorities. Steve tried to leave Salem with the money he'd stolen but Doug stopped him before he could do so. Desperate, Steve pulled out a gun and told Doug to let him leave. Steve finally got away, but later returned out of guilt for having scammed his own sister. Doug once again told Steve that he wouldn't tell Julie what had happened as long as he confessed on his own about the phony antiques. Steve finally did so. To make sure that Steve didn't try anything like that again, Doug forced him to sign a document confessing to everything he had done. He would keep that document hidden away but warned Steve that he'd show it to Julie if he ever pulled another scam.

Meanwhile, Doug yearned to have a child with Julie. She, on the other hand, wasn't too keen on the idea of having another child. After a while, though, she finally decided to start a family with Doug. But just as they had taken this decision, they received word that Rebecca and Johnny Collins had perished in a plane crash in Tokyo, leaving her son Dougie without parents. Though Robert was Dougie's adoptive father, Rebecca had left a letter behind telling Doug that she had been artificially inseminated with Doug's sperm. Doug was shocked at the fact that he had fathered Dougie and immediately set up a trust fund to leave him. However, he didn't know how to explain the situation to Robert. Though the letter was left to Doug, Robert began to have his suspicions about the contents of the letter. Finally, Doug told him that he was Dougie's natural father. The news created a conflict for them since Robert had been planning on moving permanently back to France. Doug didn't want to take custody of Dougie from Robert, but he wanted to be a part of Dougie's life. In the end, Robert maintained custody while allowing Doug to be active in Dougie's life; he also decided not to move back to France so that Doug could watch his son grow up.

At this time, Julie suffered a horrific accident while cooking at Maggie's farm. A faulty stove exploded in Julie's face and she caught on fire. Though Julie survived the accident, almost the entire left side of her face suffered third-degree burns, permanently scarring her. As a result of really bad advice from Laura Horton, Julie's therapist, Doug's reaction to Julie's accident was all wrong. Following Laura's advice, Doug pretended to be happy and ignored Julie's disfigurement, instead of being honest about how he felt. This caused Julie to believe that Doug was disgusted by her but pitied her to be nice. Consequently, Julie ran away from Salem as soon as she was able to move about on her own. She eventually returned. Doug soon learned that Laura was being treated for mental problems and realized that many of their problems had surged from Laura's instability. Meanwhile, Doug encouraged Julie to have corrective surgery for her face. However, after a failed skin graft, Julie became depressed. Yet Doug continued to support her and told her to go to Mexico so that she could get an opinion from a surgeon there. When Julie returned, she brought back horrible news. The doctors had told her that there was little chance of restoring her face, so she decided to get a divorce! While in Mexico, Julie had come to the conclusion that her grotesque appearance would drag Doug down, so she had dissolved their marriage. Doug was furious that Julie thought so little of him that she would actually believe had only married her for her beauty. Outraged, he tore the divorce papers and tried to get Julie to return to Mexico and undo the divorce. However, Julie had made up her mind. She claimed to love Doug too much to watch his love turn to pity. So despite Doug's pleas to the contrary, she moved out. They later reconciled.

Doug is now retired and spends his time traveling with wife Julie.

In 2008, Doug and Julie returned to Salem for the holiday celebrations at Alice's and at Salem University Hospital. They returned again on December 24, 2009 for the Horton Family Christmas. Julie gave Bo and Hope advice on saving their marriage.  On December 31, 2009 Julie and Doug were planning to ring in the new year at Chez Rouge with Maggie.  On January 8, 2010 Doug discovers that Mickey Horton has died of a heart attack. He is in town to comfort Maggie along with Julie, Nathan, Lucas, and the rest of the Hortons. On January 12, 2010 Doug met Hope at the Brady Pub and advised her not to give up on her marriage. Doug and Julie returned again in June 2010 for the funeral services of Alice Horton. Doug made an onscreen appearance during the annual Horton Tree Trimming on December 26, 2013 and again in 2014. He returned again in the spring of 2015 with Julie to visit Hope. Both Doug and Julie were highly involved with the show's 50th anniversary and were around to help Hope deal with the sudden death of Bo Brady from cancer.

In 2015, 2016, 2017, 2018, 2019 and 2020, Doug and Julie continued their annual Christmas tree trimming, adding ornaments for Chase, Parker, and Thomas Jack (2015), Chad, Eli and Rafe (2017), Charlotte and Mackenzie (2019), and Ben, Henry, and Lani (2020).

In 2021, Doug began doing uncharacteristic things: confusing Roman with John, and calling Marlena Evans Vivian Alamain. A concerned Julie took him to the hospital, where they could find nothing wrong, but after Doug groped Paulina Price, he again went in for testing, where Marlena discovered that he is possessed by the devil! Because of his age, the possession caused him significant pain and nearly killed him, before Marlena Evans agreed to let the Devil back into her, to save Williams, but in the process, "Marlena" (the Devil) attacked Julie, blamed Doug, and then had him committed to Bayview Mental Hospital.

Behind the Scenes
For his portrayal of Doug Williams, Bill Hayes was given the Daytime Emmy Lifetime Achievement Award in 2018. Hayes was also nominated for Emmy Awards for Outstanding Actor in a Daytime Drama Series in 1975 and 1976.

See also 
Doug and Julie Williams
Days of Our Lives

References

External links 
Doug at soapcentral.com

Days of Our Lives characters
Television characters introduced in 1970
Fictional con artists
Male characters in television
Fictional characters incorrectly presumed dead